HIP 65426 b is a super Jupiter exoplanet orbiting the star HIP 65426. It was discovered on 6 July 2017 by the SPHERE consortium using the Spectro-Polarimetric High-Contrast Exoplanet Research (SPHERE) instrument belonging to the European Southern Observatory (ESO). It is 385 light-years from Earth. It is the first planet discovered by ESO's SPHERE instrument.

Overview 
The exoplanet HIP 65426 b orbits its host star HIP 65426. This planetary system is located in the constellation Centaurus. The planet is around 14 million years old. However, it is not associated with a debris disk, despite its young age, causing it to not fit current models for planetary formation. It is around 92 AU from its parent star, with a possible dusty atmosphere. It was discovered as part of the SHINE program, which aimed to find planetary systems around 600 new stars.

In August 2022, this planet and its host star were included among 20 systems to be named by the third NameExoWorlds project. In September 2022, it became the first exoplanet directly observed by the James Webb Space Telescope.

Planetary atmosphere
The spectrum taken in 2020 has indicated that HIP 65426 b is carbon-poor and oxygen-rich compared to Solar System gas giants.

James Webb Space Telescope observation 
In August 2022, a pre-print of the James Webb Space Telescope (JWST) observations was published. The atmospheric fitting of both temperature and radius are in disagreement with evolutionary models. The team also constrained the semi-major axis and the inclination of the planet, but the new JWST astrometry of the planet did not significantly improve the orbit of the planet, especially the eccentricity remains unconstrained.

HIP 65426 b is the first exoplanet to be imaged by JWST and the first exoplanet to be detected beyond 5 μm. The observations demonstrate that the James Webb Space Telescope will exceed its nominal predicted performance by a factor of 10 and that it will be able to image 0.3  planets at 100 au for main-sequence stars, Neptune and Uranus-mass objects at 100-200 au for M-dwarfs and Saturn-mass objects at 10 au for M-dwarfs. For α Cen A JWST might be able to push the limit to a 5  planet at 0.5 to 2.5 au.

See also 
 Lists of exoplanets
 List of exoplanets discovered in 2017

References 

Exoplanets detected by direct imaging
Exoplanets discovered in 2017
Giant planets
Centaurus (constellation)